The Hudson's Bay Company Department Store is an historic building in Victoria, British Columbia, Canada.  It is currently being used as a public market space.

See also
 List of historic places in Victoria, British Columbia

References

External links
 

Buildings and structures in Victoria, British Columbia
Hudson's Bay Company